"Step into the Light" is a song by Australian singer-songwriter Darren Hayes from his third solo album, This Delicate Thing We've Made. The track was remixed several times and a remix EP was released in April 2007 to promote the album in clubs and pubs. The song became popular in the United States, peaking at #5 on the Hot Dance Club Play chart. The album version of the song was revealed on YouTube in May 2007.

Track listings

 UK promotional EP #1
 "Step into the Light" (Hook N Sling Mix) – 7:23
 "Step into the Light" (Moto Blanco Club Mix) – 8:13
 "Step into the Light" (Moto Blanco Dub Mix) – 8:03
 "Step into the Light" (Shave and Sugar Remix) – 7:26
 "Step into the Light" (Shave and Sugar Dub) – 7:18
 "Step into the Light" (Wayne G & Andy Allder Circuit Anthem) – 9:22
 "Step into the Light" (Moto Blanco Radio Mix) – 3:15

 UK promotional EP #2
 "Step into the Light" (Moto Blanco Club Mix) – 8:13
 "Step into the Light" (Wayne G & Andy Allder Circuit Anthem) – 9:22
 "Step into the Light" (Tony Moran Club Mix) – 8:54
 "Step into the Light" (Dave Pezza Club Mix) – 8:30
 "Step into the Light" (Shave and Sugar Remix) – 7:26
 "Step into the Light" (Hook N Sling Mix) – 7:23
 "Step into the Light" (Tony Moran Radio Mix) – 4:31
 "Step into the Light" (Moto Blanco Radio Mix) – 3:15

 UK promotional EP #3
 "Step into the Light" (Shave and Sugar Dub) – 7:18
 "Step into the Light" (Hook N Sling Mix) – 7:23
 "Step into the Light" (Moto Blanco Dub Mix) – 8:03
 "Step into the Light" (Dave Pezza Dub Mix) – 8:30
 "Step into the Light" (Shave and Sugar Remix) – 7:26
 "Step into the Light" (Moto Blanco Club Mix) – 8:13

 US promotional EP #1
 "Step into the Light" (Tony Moran Radio Mix) – 4:31
 "Step into the Light" (Moto Blanco Radio Mix) – 3:15
 "Step into the Light" (Tony Moran Club Mix) – 8:54
 "Step into the Light" (Moto Blanco Club Mix) – 8:13
 "Step into the Light" (Hook N Sling Mix) – 7:23

 US promotional EP #2
 "Step into the Light" (Tony Moran Club Mix) – 8:54
 "Step into the Light" (Moto Blanco Club Mix) – 8:13
 "Step into the Light" (Moto Blanco Dub Mix) – 8:03
 "Step into the Light" (Moto Blanco Club Vox-Up) – 8:13
 "Step into the Light" (Dave Pezza Club Mix) – 8:30
 "Step into the Light" (Dave Pezza Dub Mix) – 8:30
 "Step into the Light" (Hook N Sling Mix) – 7:23

Chart performance

References

External links
Darren Hayes official website
"Step Into the Light" video on YouTube
Official lyrics to "Step into the Light"

2007 singles
Darren Hayes songs
Songs written by Robert Conley (music producer)
Songs written by Darren Hayes
2007 songs